Rosenthal am Rennsteig is a municipality in the district Saale-Orla-Kreis, in Thuringia, Germany. It was created with effect from 1 January 2019 by the merger of the former municipalities of Birkenhügel, Blankenberg, Blankenstein, Harra, Neundorf bei Lobenstein, Pottiga and Schlegel.

References

Municipalities in Thuringia
Saale-Orla-Kreis